Interfax-Ukraine is a Ukrainian news agency. Founded in 1992, the company publishes in Ukrainian, Russian, English & German.

The company owns a 50-seat press centre.

The staff of the agency is 105 people (as of the end of February 2022)

History 

Interfax was formed on 24 November 1992, the year following Ukraine's 1991 independence, by a team of 10 people in Kharkiv. In 1993 the agency moved to Kyiv.

References

External links

News agencies based in Ukraine
Mass media in Kyiv
1992 establishments in Ukraine